The Sikh Gurdwara of San Jose is a gurdwara (a Sikh place of worship) located in the Evergreen district of San Jose, California. It was founded in 1984 by leaders of the then-rapidly growing community of Sikhs in the area. It is the largest Gurdwara in the world outside of India.

History

Initially, the community met in a rented community center, but soon bought a small building in east San Jose. After buying nearby land in 1995, they decided it would be too expensive to build in the city limits, so they sold that land and bought a larger property further east. The first phase of the project of almost  was completed in 2004.

The chief architect and designer of the project is the late Malkiat Singh Sidhu. The largest audience at the San Jose Gurdwara was on opening day when some 20,000 people were thought to have come.

Architecture
The gurdwara includes a prayer hall, called the "main Diwan Hall", that sees 10,000 in attendance every Sunday. It also includes a kitchen and accompanying hall to provide Langar service. Additionally, the grounds include a school wing that hosts about 700 students every Sunday for Punjabi, kirtan, and gurbani classes, basketball courts, and a free health clinic.

See also
Gurdwaras in the United States

References

External links

Official website
Event Guide

Culture of San Jose, California
Sikh places
San Jose
Buildings and structures in San Jose, California
Religious buildings and structures in Santa Clara County, California
1985 establishments in California
Buildings and structures in Santa Clara County, California